Joachim Norberg (born 31 July 1968) is a Swedish shooter. He competes in the SH1 disability class.

Norberg won a silver medal at the 2016 Summer Paralympics in the 25 metre pistol.

References 

1968 births
Living people
Swedish male sport shooters
Paralympic shooters of Sweden
Paralympic silver medalists for Sweden
Paralympic medalists in shooting
Shooters at the 2016 Summer Paralympics
Medalists at the 2016 Summer Paralympics
Shooters at the 2020 Summer Paralympics
20th-century Swedish people
21st-century Swedish people